OrangeFS is an open-source parallel file system, the next generation of Parallel Virtual File System (PVFS).  A parallel file system is a type of distributed file system that distributes file data across multiple servers and provides for concurrent access by multiple tasks of a parallel application.  OrangeFS was designed for use in large-scale cluster computing and is used by companies, universities, national laboratories and similar sites worldwide.

Versions and features
2.8.5
 Server-to-server communication infrastructure
 SSD option for storage of distributed metadata
 Full native Windows client support
 Replication for immutable files

2.8.6
 Direct interface for applications
 Client caching for the direct interface with multi-process single-system coherence
 Initial release of the webpack supporting WebDAV and S3 via Apache modules

2.8.7
 Updates, fixes and performance improvements

2.8.8
 Updates, fixes and performance improvements, native Hadoop support via JNI shim, support for newer Linux kernels

2.9
 Distributed Metadata for Directory Entries
 Capability-based security in 3 modes
 Standard security
 Key-based security
 Certificate-based security with LDAP interface support
 Extended documentation

History
OrangeFS emerged as a development branch of PVFS2, so much of its history is shared with the history of PVFS. Spanning twenty years, the extensive history behind OrangeFS is summarized in the time line below.

A development branch is a new direction in development. The OrangeFS branch was begun in 2007, when leaders in the PVFS2 user community determined that:
 Many were satisfied with the design goals of PVFS2 and needed it to remain relatively unchanged for future stability
 Others envisioned PVFS2 as a foundation on which to build an entirely new set of design objectives for more advanced applications of the future. 
This is why OrangeFS is often described as the next generation of PVFS2.

1993
Parallel Virtual File System (PVFS) was developed by Walt Ligon and Eric Blumer under a NASA grant to study I/O patterns of parallel programs. PVFS version 0 was based on the Vesta parallel file system developed at IBM's Thomas J. Watson Research Center, and its name was derived from its development to work on Parallel Virtual Machine (PVM).
1994
Rob Ross rewrote PVFS to use TCP/IP, departing significantly from the original Vesta design. PVFS version 1 was targeted to a cluster of DEC Alpha workstations on FDDI, a predecessor to Fast Ethernet networking. PVFS made significant gains over Vesta in the area of scheduling disk I/O while multiple clients access a common file.
Late 1994'''
The Goddard Space Flight Center chose PVFS as the file system for the first Beowulf (early implementations of Linux-based commodity computers running in parallel). Ligon and Ross worked with key GSFC developers, including Thomas Sterling, Donald Becker, Dan Ridge, and Eric Hendricks over the next several years.
1997
PVFS released as an open-source package
1999
Ligon proposed the development of a new PVFS version. Initially developed at Clemson University, the design was completed in a joint effort among contributors from Clemson, Argonne National Laboratory and the Ohio Supercomputer Center, including major contributions by Phil Carns, a PhD student at Clemson.
2003
PVFS2 released, featuring object servers, distributed metadata, accommodation of multiple metadata servers, file views based on MPI (Message Passing Interface, a protocol optimized for high performance computing) for multiple network types, and a flexible architecture for easy experimentation and extensibility. PVFS2 becomes an “Open Community” project, with contributions from many universities and companies around the world.
2005
PVFS version 1 was retired. PVFS2 is still supported by Clemson and Argonne. In recent years, various contributors (many of them charter designers and developers) continued to improve PVFS performance.
2007
Argonne National Laboratories chose PVFS2 for its IBM Blue Gene/P, a super computer sponsored by the U.S. Department of Energy.
2008
Ligon and others at Clemson began exploring possibilities for the next generation of PVFS in a roadmap that included the growing needs of mainstream cluster computing in the business sector. As they began developing extensions for supporting large directories of small files, security enhancements, and redundancy capabilities, many of these goals conflicted with development for Blue Gene. With diverging priorities, the PVFS source code was divided into two branches. The branch for the new roadmap became "Orange" in honor of Clemson school colors, and the branch for legacy systems was dubbed "Blue" for its pioneering customer installation at Argonne. OrangeFS became the new open systems brand to represent this next-generation virtual file system, with an emphasis on security, redundancy and a broader range of applications.
Fall 2010
OrangeFS became the main branch of PVFS, and Omnibond began offering commercial support for OrangeFS/PVFS, with new feature requests from paid support customers receiving highest development priority. First production release of OrangeFS introduced.
Spring 2011 OrangeFS 2.8.4 released
September 2011 OrangeFS adds Windows client
February 2012 OrangeFS 2.8.5 released
June 2012 OrangeFS 2.8.6 released, offering improved performance, web clients and direct-interface libraries. The new OrangeFS Web pack provides integrated support for WebDAV and S3.
January 2013 OrangeFS 2.8.7 released
May 2013 OrangeFS available on Amazon Web Services marketplace. OrangeFS 2.9 Beta Version available, adding two new security modes and allowing distribution of directory entries among multiple data servers.
April 2014 OrangeFS 2.8.8 released adding shared mmap support, JNI support for Hadoop Ecosystem Applications supporting direct replacement of HDFS
November 2014 OrangeFS 2.9.0 released adding support for distributed metadata for directory entries using an extensible hashing algorithm modeled after giga+, POSIX backward compatible capability base security supporting multiple modes.
January 2015 OrangeFS 2.9.1 released
March 2015 OrangeFS 2.9.2 released
June 2015 OrangeFS 2.9.3 released
November 2015 OrangeFS included in CloudyCluster 1.0 release on AWS
May 2016 OrangeFS supported in Linux Kernel 4.6
October 2017 2.9.6 Released
January 2018 2.9.7 Released, OrangeFS rpm will now be included in Fedora distribution 
February 2019 CloudyCluster v2 released on AWS marketplace featuring OrangeFS
June 2019 CloudyCluster v2 released on GCP featuring OrangeFS
July 2019 OreangeFS is integrated with the Linux page cache in Linux kernel 5.2
January 2020 OrangeFS interim fix for write after open issues, merged into the Linux kernel 5.5
August 2020 kernel patch back to 5.4lts that fixes issues with nonstandard block sizes.
September 2020 2.9.8 Released
June 2021 Linux 5.13 kernel: OrangeFS readahead in the in Linux kernel has been reworked to take advantage of the new xarray and readahead_expand logic.  This significantly improved read performance. 
July 2021 df results bug - df on OrangeFS was reporting way too small vs. reality and causing canned installer (and confused human) issues.   This has been backported to several previous kernels in addition to pulled into the latest.

References

External links
 Orange File System - Next Generation of the Parallel Virtual File System
 Architecture of a Next-Generation Parallel File System (Video archive)
 Scalable Distributed Directory Implementation on Orange File System
 Elasticluster with OrangeFS
 OrangeFS in the AWS Marketplace

Free software
Distributed file systems supported by the Linux kernel
Distributed file systems